Benjamin Warren Hanson (born 1987) is an American politician of the North Dakota Democratic-NPL Party. From 2012 to 2016, he represented the 16th district in the North Dakota House of Representatives, during which time, he served as a Chair of the Democratic-NPL House Caucus. Hanson is also a commercial realtor. On August 16, 2017, Hanson announced his candidacy for the 2018 House of Representatives election in North Dakota.

References

External links
 
Legislative page

1987 births
Living people
American real estate brokers
21st-century American politicians
Minnesota State University Moorhead alumni
North Dakota State University alumni
People from West Fargo, North Dakota
Democratic Party members of the North Dakota House of Representatives